Umidjan Babamuradowiç Astanow (born 11 August 1990) is a Turkmen footballer currently playing for Nebitçi FT in the Ýokary Liga as a  midfielder. Former player of Turkmenistan national football team.

Club career 
He began his career in the football club FC Merw. Since 2013, he has played for FC Balkan and won the AFC-President's Cup 2013 in Malaysia with them. In 2015, he moved to the FC Altyn Asyr.

On 2019, Astanow joined FC Merw.

Umidjan Astanow joined Energetik FK in January 2020. After unsuccessful trials at Energetik FK Astanow signed contract with Nebitçi FT in August 2020.

International career 

He played for the Olympic team of Turkmenistan at the Asian Games 2010 in Guangzhou. Umidjan was also called up for the Olympic team of Turkmenistan that competed in the London 2012 Olympics.

Astanow made his senior national team debut in 2012 AFC Challenge Cup. Last time played for senior team at 2017.

Honors
AFC Challenge Cup:
Runners-up: 2012

AFC President's Cup:
 Champion: 2013

References

External links
 
 

1990 births
Living people
Turkmenistan footballers
Turkmenistan international footballers
Association football midfielders
Footballers at the 2010 Asian Games
Asian Games competitors for Turkmenistan
FC Altyn Asyr players